The 2011 FA Trophy Final was the 42nd final of the Football Association's cup competition for levels 5–8 of the English football league system. The match was contested by Mansfield Town and Darlington. Neither team had ever reached the FA trophy final before, and had only recently become eligible for the FA trophy after Mansfield Town were relegated from League Two in 2008 and Darlington were relegated from League Two in 2010.

Mansfield Town defeated Worksop Town, Newport County, Alfreton Town, Chasetown, and Luton Town en route to the Final.

Darlington defeated Tamworth, Bath City, A.F.C. Telford United, Salisbury City, and Gateshead en route to the final.

Darlington won 1–0 in extra time, after the match had ended in a 0–0 draw. The goal was scored by Chris Senior in the 119th minute, seconds before the match was due to end in a penalty shoot-out.

Route to the final

Mansfield Town

Darlington

Match

Summary

The final was played on 7 May 2011 at London's Wembley Stadium. Darlington defeated Mansfield Town 1–0 after extra time, thanks to a goal from striker Chris Senior. This was the first time that Darlington had scored at Wembley in three visits to the national stadium.

The game was a particularly even affair with both sides carving out early chances. Darlington goalkeeper Sam Russell had to be alert early on to clear an Adam Murray pass which had sent Duncan Russell clean through on goal. At the other end, Alan Marriott did well to punch away a corner from Aaron Brown before Liam Hatch could get his head on it. In the 18th minute, a Mansfield corner was met by the head of former Darlington captain Steve Foster, but the ball sailed well over the bar. On 32 minutes, Gary Smith broke into the Mansfield, where he appeared to be brought down by Louis Briscoe. Referee Stuart Attwell, who was well placed, waved away the penalty appeals. Darlington suffered a blow on 38 minutes when Smith, who had been lively in midfield, limped off to be replaced by Aman Verma. The first half of the match concluded with the score at 0–0.

Despite Darlington dominating the opening exchanges of the second half, Mansfield created an excellent chance when Briscoe took on two players from the right and his cross-shot was deflected just over the bar by his team-mate Paul Connor. After 58 minutes Darlington had an excellent chance to take the lead. John Campbell broke clear down the left hand side of the pitch and crossed low for Tommy Wright; the striker took too long, however, and Mansfield were able to clear for a corner. Both sides traded attacks, none of which came to much, before Darlington were awarded an 89th minute free-kick 25 yards out, following an unfair challenge on Verma. Marc Bridge-Wilkinson took the free-kick, which clattered against Marriott's right hand post, with the Mansfield 'keeper well beaten.
In the dying seconds of normal time, Bridge-Wilkinson crossed into the box where Wright headed wide with a diving attempt. When the whistle blew for the end of normal time, the match remained at 0–0.

Both teams created chances, during an extra time period marked by both teams increasing fatigue. During extra-time, Darlington replaced Bridge-Wilkinson with Paul Terry, while Mansfield brought on Danny Mitchley for Murray. During a fraught final period of extra time Mansfield threatened when Ashley Cain's cross reached the far post where Connor headed narrowly over the bar. Then, eight minutes from time, Chris Moore forced a Darlington corner. Brown took it and Wright headed against the post, before Ian Miller forced a fine save from Marriott.

As a penalty shoot-out loomed over the match, Darlington created one last chance. In the 119th minute, an Aaron Brown long throw was flicked on by Miller and found Wright, who got to the ball ahead of Marriott to send a looping header towards the Mansfield goal. The ball hit the bar before falling to Chris Senior who headed into the roof of the net to send the Darlington fans into raptures and secure an FA Trophy final victory for Darlington.

Details

See also
2011 FA Trophy: Match Highlights

References

FA Trophy Finals
FA Trophy Final
Fa Trophy Final
Fa Trophy Final 2011
Fa Trophy Final 2011
Events at Wembley Stadium